Forrer is a surname. Notable people with the surname include:

 Emil Forrer (1894–1986), Swiss Assyriologist and Hittitologist
 Hans Forrer (1929–2017), Swiss alpine skier
 Leonard Forrer (1869–1953), Swiss-born British numismatist and coin dealer
 Ludwig Forrer (1845–1921), Swiss politician
 Willi Forrer (born 1935), Swiss alpine skier